Paremhat 14 - Coptic Calendar - Paremhat 16

The fifteenth day of the Coptic month of Paremhat, the seventh month of the Coptic year. In common years, this day corresponds to March 11, of the Julian Calendar, and March 24, of the Gregorian Calendar. This day falls in the Coptic Season of Shemu, the season of the Harvest.

Commemorations

Martyrs 

 The martyrdom of Saint Helias of Ahnas

Saints 

 The departure of Saint Sarah the Nun

References 

Days of the Coptic calendar